Series 3 of Project Catwalk began 9 January 2008, and features 13 contestants vying for the prizes, which include £25,000, a clothing range courtesy of Oli, and a full feature fashion spread in Grazia magazine. Kelly Osbourne returns as the show's host.

Contestants

Models 
Akos Asumadu-Sakyi
Ashley
Gemma
Jo Lawden
Kristina Lomax
Lezel
Lynda Murray
Rachel Ritfeld
Sammy Bennett
Sarah Butler
Tanita Baptiste
Xenia
Tash Wilson

Designer progress 

 Green background and WINNER means the designer won the competition
 Brown background means they advanced to Fashion Week, but did not win.
 Blue background and WIN means the designer won that challenge.
 Red background and OUT means the designer lost and was out of the competition.
 Turquoise background and HIGH means the designer was either in the top two, or first announced to be in the top for that challenge.
 Light blue background and HIGH means the designer had one of the highest scores for that challenge.
 Pink background and LOW means the designer had one of the lowest scores for that challenge.
 Orange background and LOW means the designer had the second lowest score for that challenge.

Challenges 

Episode 1 – A Catfight on the Catwalk
The designers had to create an outfit that reflected their personalities. However, the only fabrics they had access to for the task would be garments from each others wardrobes.
Guest Judge: Zandra Rhodes
WINNER: Ross
OUT: James

Episode 2 – Re-Designing Nancy
The designers had to create a dress for Nancy Dell'Olio to get her from the worst dressed list to the best dressed list. They have to work in teams of two. This week there would be a double elimination.
The Teams were:Viv with FionnualaKaty with AngieClinton with KekoJules with DebbieJasper with ChelseyRoss with Tom
Guest Judge:  Nancy Dell'Olio
WINNER: Jasper and Chelsey
OUT: Jules and Keko.Episode 3 – Mac DaddyThe designers had to re-invent the Macintosh. Half of the group design womenswear, the other half design menswear.
Guest Judge: Gary Bott
WINNER: Katy and Ross 
OUT: DebbieEpisode 4 – Fireworks With FiretrapThe designers had to work in teams of three to create a capture collection for a Firetrap customer shopping for a music festival.
The Teams were:Fionnuala with Jasper and AngieViv with Ross and Chelsey Katy with Clinton and Tom
Guest Judge: Sophie Clinch
WINNER: Viv and Clinton
OUT: AngieEpisode 5 – Fashion FutureThe designers use vintage clothing as material to create new trend setting looks.
Guest Judge: Henry Holland
WINNER: Tom 
OUT: FionnualaEpisode 6 – A Fashionable CauseThe designers designed a shirt for the "Fashion Targets Breast Cancer" charity incorporating the charity's signature target logo (consisting of a variety of blue rings).
Guest Judge: Vanja Strok
WINNER:  Jasper
OUT: TomEpisode 7 – Show StopperThe designers make a stage costume for a pop star Sophie Ellis-Bextor.
Guest Judge: Sophie Ellis-Bextor
WINNER: Chelsey 
OUT: ClintonEpisode 8 – Airline ChallengeThe designers make an airline flight attendant uniform.
Guest Judge:  Niall Duffy
WINNER: Katy 
OUT: None.  The judges decided to keep the bottom two, Viv and Ross, and eliminate two designers in the next challenge.Episode 9 – Kelly Osbourne Dress Challenge The designers create an evening-gown for Kelly Osbourne.
 Guest Judge : Jade Bien-Aimee Sutherland
 WINNER: Chelsey
 OUT: Ross and Katy. This episode marks the last of the series in the traditional format. The three finalists: Chelsey, Viv and Jasper now must produce a collection to exhibit at London Fashion Week. 
 Of note, this episode was dedicated to the guest judge Jade Bien-Aimee Sutherland, who committed suicide in December 2007 by jumping off Albert Bridge in London. She was the former stylist to Naomi Campbell.
 Episode 10 – Finale'''
 In the final episode of the series, Viv, Chelsey and Japser showcased their twelve piece collections.  Viv's was inspired by the British seaside town of Whitby, Chelsey's by Venice, and Jasper's by Salvador Dalí's surrealist castle.
 Viv was placed third, Chelsey came a close second, but the winner was Jasper Garvida.
 WINNER: Jasper
 RUNNER-UP: Chelsey
 THIRD PLACE: Viv

External links 

2008 British television seasons
Season 03
2008 in fashion